Medicago scutellata is a plant species of the genus Medicago. It is found throughout the Mediterranean basin. It forms a symbiotic relationship with the bacterium Sinorhizobium meliloti, which is capable of nitrogen fixation. Common names include snail medick and shield medick.

Gallery

References

External links
 International Legume Database & Information Services

scutellata
Taxa named by Philip Miller